Lê Cao Hoài An (born 19 September 1993) is a Vietnamese footballer who plays as a central midfielder for V.League 1 club  Hồ Chí Minh City

References

1993 births
Living people
Vietnamese footballers
Association football midfielders
V.League 1 players
Vietnam international footballers
Khanh Hoa FC players